Anthony Kimble is a former American football running back. He was signed by the Miami Dolphins as an undrafted free agent in 2009. He also played for the New York Jets.

College career 
Kimble attended Stanford University where he played college football for the Stanford Cardinal. During his career at Stanford, Kimble rushed for 1,940 yards and 18 touchdowns. He led Stanford in rushing in both 2006 and 2007.

Professional career

Miami Dolphins 
Kimble signed with the Miami Dolphins as rookie free agent on May 1, 2009. He was waived on August 24.

New York Jets 
After being released by the Dolphins, Kimble signed with the New York Jets.

References 

Stanford Cardinal football players
Living people
1980s births
Year of birth uncertain